Hamachi may refer to:

 Hamachi (fish), a Japanese amberjack or buri commonly used in sushi
 Hamachi (software), a virtual private network (VPN) application
 Hamachi, a fictional character in the manga Yōkaiden
 My Youth Romantic Comedy Is Wrong, As I Expected, a light novel series also known as